The Bouchia clawed frog (Xenopus pygmaeus) is a species of frog in the family Pipidae found in the Central African Republic, the Democratic Republic of the Congo, Uganda, and possibly the Republic of the Congo.  Its natural habitats are subtropical or tropical moist lowland forests, swamps, freshwater marshes, intermittent freshwater marshes, rural gardens, and heavily degraded former forests.

References

Further reading
 

Xenopus
Taxonomy articles created by Polbot
Amphibians described in 1986